Ford Green & Smallthorne railway station is a disused railway station in Stoke-on-Trent, England.

History
The station was opened in 1864 by the North Staffordshire Railway on the company's Biddulph Valley Line. Originally called Ford Green the name was changed in the 1880s to Ford Green and Smallthorne. The Biddulph Valley line had opened in 1860 and was primarily concerned with mineral traffic, mostly coal and ironstone from the collieries and ironworks along the Biddulph Valley.  Passenger services were of a much lesser interest to the NSR so it was not until a few years later that a number of stations were opened supported by an infrequent number of passenger trains.

Passenger traffic was never intensive and by 1922 all the places along the valley were better served by bus services. Consequently, the London, Midland and Scottish Railway withdrew the passenger services in 1927, although the station continued to be used for excursion trains until the 1960s.  Full closure of the station occurred in January 1964.

Route

References

Notes

Sources
 
 
 

Disused railway stations in Staffordshire
Railway stations in Great Britain closed in 1927
Railway stations in Great Britain opened in 1864
Former North Staffordshire Railway stations